The term Dalit Christian or Christian Dalit is used to describe those who have converted to Christianity from other forms of religion in India, and are still categorised as Dalits in Hindu, Christian, Muslim, and Sikh societies in South Asia. Hindu Dalits are sometimes referred to as Harijans. About 90% of Pakistani Christians are Dalits from the Chuhra caste and at least 9% of Indian Christians are Dalits, categorised thus by the greater societal practices in various parts of the Indian subcontinent.

Caste system

Christian missionaries who were evangelising in colonial India fought against the idea of a caste system within church. However, some people within the different branches of Christianity in South Asia still engage in societal practices with regard to the caste system, along with all its customs and norms, to varying degrees depending on their background. Though other Christians in the Indian subcontinent may not practice a caste culture themselves, they may face societal discrimination outside their Christian community for the caste they belong to. Asif Aqeel and Sama Faruqi documented in Herald Magazine:

Within the three major Christian branches in South Asia, there were historically and are currently different levels of caste acceptance. The Protestant churches have been most consistent among the Christian community in repudiating it as part of the Hindu social order while attempting to establish a caste-less Christian community. The Roman Catholic Church is said to sometimes develop a more culturally consistent view, treating the caste system as part of the Indian social structure and, for much of its history in India; similarly, the Syrian Orthodox Churches have sometimes responded in like fashion, except it has tended to collectively act as one caste within the caste system instead of maintaining different castes within their churches. However, Protestant churches have fared no better than Catholic churches other than the fact that mainly Dalit dioceses have got Dalit Bishops. The other ways where the presence of caste is seen among Indian churches include the non-acceptance of a Dalit priest, maintaining separate entrance for Dalits in churches, separate seating, and other features.

Other major factors affecting Dalit Christians and other Christians within India in regard to caste statutes are the regional variances in maintaining the caste system. Rural communities are said to hold more strongly to the caste system than the urban communities and Roman Catholics are the majority of Christians in these communities. The urban areas tend to have the least pressure to maintain caste classes and Protestant churches are aid to be best represented in this background.

After conversion, people in India lose any privileges they had in their former caste, while those in lower castes often gain more opportunities. Although a significant number of Indian Christians are unofficially reported to be Dalit Christians, the Sachar Committee on Muslim Affairs reported that only 9% of Indian Christians have Scheduled Caste status, with a further 32.8% having Scheduled Tribe status, and 24.8% belonging to other disadvantaged groups.

In the 1990s there were protests against those Christian organizations that still practiced some form of the caste system and for discrimination in leadership positions; Dalits saw those practices as contrary to Jesus's egalitarianism. Dalit Christians have frequently criticized the Church for not just tolerating but hiding the discriminatory practices among Dalit Christians.

Leonard Fernando, G. Gispert-Sauch writes that: "Today, no Indian Christian think would approve or speak of tolerating the caste reality. There are many, however, who live in it." Dalits that have become Christians in south India have transformed their position as just spectators in Hindu religious practice to that of leaders and representatives of the Christian religion; they have also become influential promoters of Dalit political aspirations.

Reservation
Reservation is available to Dalits who follow Hinduism, Buddhism, and Sikhism, but Dalit Christians and Muslims are not protected as castes under Indian Reservation policy. The Indian constitution in 1950 abolished untouchability, converting those castes to scheduled castes and tribes: in doing so it also provided a system of affirmative action (called the Reservation Policy) whereby 22.5 percent of all government and semi-government jobs including seats in Parliament and state legislatures were reserved for those in those castes; the law also set aside space for admission to schools and colleges. In 1980 the constitutional policy was extended to cover the rest of the 3,743 backward castes in the country. But Christians who claim to belong to no caste are not included in the quotas, meaning those Dalits who convert to Christianity are no longer part of the affirmative action program run by the government. Dalit Christians have now appealed to the government to extend the benefits of reservation policy to Dalit Christians to improve their employment opportunities.  In 2008, a study commissioned by the National Commission for Minorities suggested extension of reservation to Dalit Muslims and Dalit Christians. According to the study, Indian Muslims and Christians should be brought under the ambit of the constitutional safeguards.

See also
Caste system among South Asian Christians
Dalit theology

References

Bibliography

Further reading
Dalit Christians: Right To Reservations, by Camil Parkhe. 2007. ISPCK. .
India’s ‘lower caste’ Dalit Christians establish media to fight discrimination, by Rita Joseph, 2020. LiCAS.news

External links
Dalit Christian Supreme Court Case Commences in India

Christianity in India
Christianity in Pakistan
Dalit